Evelyn Del Rio (born Evelyn Bernadette Janer; September 22, 1931 – November 26, 1998) was an American stage and screen actress, best known for her role as Elsie Mae Sousé in The Bank Dick.

She began her professional career at the age of 4  as a dancer billed as the "Latin Shirley Temple.” Until the age of 13 she was a headline dancer at the Cotton Club and the Apollo Theater, whereupon she toured with Carmen Miranda. During World War II she entertained troops for the USO. After the war she appeared uncredited as a young girl in Thrill of a Romance, her final film role. In the early 1950s she retired from entertainment in order to focus on her family. She died in Burbank, California on November 26, 1998 from complications related to diabetes and a stroke.

References

External links
 

1931 births
1998 deaths
20th-century Puerto Rican actresses
American child actresses
American film actresses
American stage actresses
American dancers
Puerto Rican dancers
People from Cataño, Puerto Rico
Deaths from diabetes